Kentner Stadium is a multi-use stadium located in Winston-Salem, North Carolina on the campus of Wake Forest University. Kentner Stadium serves as home to the Demon Deacons track and field and field hockey teams. It also housed the Deacon soccer teams until they moved across campus to Spry Stadium.

It can seat up to 4,000 spectators and is named for Jeff Kentner, of Charlotte, North Carolina who donated large sums of money to the university.

The stadium has also been used by area Special Olympic events.

External links
 Information at Wake Forest athletics

Athletics (track and field) venues in North Carolina
College field hockey venues in the United States
Wake Forest Demon Deacons field hockey
Sports venues in Winston-Salem, North Carolina
Soccer venues in North Carolina
College track and field venues in the United States
College soccer venues in the United States